Yue Xin (Chinese: 岳鑫, born 10 November 1995 in Wuhan) is a Chinese football player who currently plays as a left-back for Zhejiang.

Club career
Yue started his professional football career in 2013 when he was loaned to Liaoning Youth's squad for the 2013 China League Two campaign. He joined Chinese Super League's newcomer Dalian Aerbin in 2014. On 20 July 2014, Yue made his debut for Dalian Aerbin in the 2014 Chinese Super League against Shanghai Shenxin, coming on as a substitute for Chen Tao in the 89th minute. He would only make a handful of appearances for the club as they were relegated at the end of the season. The following season he was unable to improve upon his position within the club and on 22 June 2015, Yue transferred to Chinese Super League side Hangzhou Greentown. 

On 16 July 2015, Yue was loaned to China League One side Wuhan Zall until 31 December 2015. In September 2016, Yue was loaned to Vejle Boldklub. He left the club after the loan spell was not extended and he returned to his parent club. On 5 August 2017, Yue would finally make his debut for Hangzhou in a league game against Yunnan Lijiang in a 1-1 draw. After the game he would quickly start to establish himself as a regular member within the team as they renamed themselves Zhejiang Professional. He would then play a vital part as the club gained promotion to the top tier at the end of the 2021 campaign.

Career statistics
Statistics accurate as of match played 31 January 2023.

References

External links
 

1995 births
Living people
Chinese footballers
Footballers from Hubei
Dalian Professional F.C. players
Zhejiang Professional F.C. players
Wuhan F.C. players
Vejle Boldklub players
Danish 1st Division players
Chinese Super League players
China League One players
China League Two players
Chinese expatriate footballers
Expatriate men's footballers in Denmark
Association football defenders